The transfer of the Crimean oblast in the Soviet Union in 1954 was an administrative action of the Presidium of the Supreme Soviet that transferred the government of Crimea from the Russian SFSR to the Ukrainian SSR.

Background

Prior to being incorporated into the Russian Empire, the Crimean Peninsula was independent under the Crimean Khanate. The Muslim Turkic Crimean Tatars were under the influence of the Ottoman Empire, while also bordering Russian Empire. In 1774, following the Russo-Turkish War of 1768–74, the Russian and Ottoman empires agreed to refrain from interfering with the Crimean Khanate through the Treaty of Küçük Kaynarca. In 1783, following the increasing decline of the Ottoman Empire, the Russian Empire annexed the Crimean Khanate.

Within Russia, the peninsula was transferred between multiple internal administrations. Through its time in the Russian Empire and the Russian SFSR, up to its transfer to the Ukrainian SSR in 1954, Crimea was administered by 14 administrations.

Throughout its time the Soviet Union, Crimea underwent a population change. As a result of alleged collaboration with the Germans by Crimean Tatars during World War II, all Crimean Tatars were deported by the Soviet regime and the peninsula was resettled with other peoples, mainly Russians and Ukrainians. Modern experts say that the deportation was part of the Soviet plan to gain access to the Dardanelles and acquire territory in Turkey, where the Tatars had Turkic ethnic kin, or to remove minorities from the Soviet Union's border regions.

Nearly 8,000 Crimean Tatars died during the deportation, and tens of thousands perished subsequently due to the harsh exile conditions.

The autonomous republic without its titled nationality was downgraded to an oblast within the Russian SFSR on 30 June 1945. 

On 19 February 1954, the oblast was transferred from the Russian SFSR to the Ukrainian SSR jurisdiction, on the basis of "the integral character of the economy, the territorial proximity and the close economic and cultural ties between the Crimea Province and the Ukrainian SSR" and to commemorate the 300th anniversary of Ukraine's union with Russia. (The Pereiaslav Agreement as it was known in the Soviet Union).

Sevastopol was a closed city due to its importance as the port of the Soviet Black Sea Fleet and was attached to the Crimean Oblast only in 1978.

Decree

On 19 February 1954, the Presidium of the Supreme Soviet of the Soviet Union issued a decree transferring the Crimean Oblast from the Russian Soviet Federative Socialist Republic to the Ukrainian Soviet Socialist Republic. 
The documents which are now housed at the State Archive of the Russian Federation (GARF) do confirm that the move was originally approved by the Presidium (Politburo) of the Communist Party of the Soviet Union (CPSU) on 25 January 1954, paving the way for the authorizing resolution of the Presidium of the Supreme Soviet of the Soviet Union three weeks later. 
According to the Soviet Constitution (article 18), the borders of a republic within the Soviet Union could not be re-drawn without the agreement of the republic in question. The transfer was approved by the Presidium of the Supreme Soviet of the Soviet Union. The constitutional change (articles 22 and 23) to accommodate the transfer was made several days after the decree issued by the Presidium of the Supreme Soviet.

The decree was first announced, on the front page of Pravda, on 27 February 1954. The full text of the decree was:

On April 26, 1954 The decree of the Presidium of the USSR Supreme Soviet transferring the Crimea Oblast from the Russian SFSR to the Ukrainian SSR.

Taking into account the integral character of the economy, the territorial proximity and the close economic and cultural ties between the Crimea Province and the Ukrainian SSR, the Presidium of the USSR Supreme Soviet decrees:

To approve the joint presentation of the Presidium of the Russian SFSR Supreme Soviet and the Presidium of the Ukrainian SSR Supreme Soviet on the transfer of the Crimea Province from the Russian SFSR to the Ukrainian SSR.

Consequently, amendments were made to the republican constitutions of Russia and Ukraine. On 2 June 1954 the Supreme Soviet of Russia adopted amendments to the Russian Constitution of 1937, which, among other things, excluded Crimea from list of subdivisions enumerated in article 14, and on 17 June 1954, the Supreme Soviet of Ukraine added Crimea to article 18 of the 1937 Constitution of the Ukrainian SSR.

Question of constitutionality 
According to a 2009 article on Russian website Pravda.ru, the Presidium of the Supreme Council gathered for a session on 19 February 1954 when only 13 of 27 members were present. There was no quorum, but the decision was adopted unanimously.

Mark Kramer professor of Cold War Studies at Harvard University countered that new sources have emerged showing that the republic parliaments of both the Russian SFSR and the Ukrainian SSR had given their consent to the transfer of Crimea and so had complied with Article 18 of the Soviet Constitution which stated that "the territory of a Union Republic may not be altered without its consent.", with the proceedings of the USSR Supreme Soviet Presidium meeting indicate that both the Russian SFSR and the Ukrainian SSR had given their consent via their republic parliaments, although Kramer also said that the "legal system in the Soviet Union was mostly a fiction". 

The text of the document signed by Russian Deputy Prosecutor General Sabir Kekhlerov stated: "Neither the Constitution of the RSFSR nor the Constitution of the USSR [an, by extension, of the UkSSR] empowers the Presidium of the Supreme Soviet of the USSR to consider changes in the constitutional legal status of Autonomous Soviet Socialist Republics, which are members of the union republics. In view of the above, the decision adopted in 1954 by the Presidium of the Supreme Soviet of the RSFSR and the Soviet on the transfer of the Crimean region of the RSFSR to the UkSSR did not correspond to the Constitution (Fundamental Law) of the RSFSR or the Constitution (Fundamental Law) of the USSR."

Motivation

The transfer of the Crimean oblast to Ukraine has been described as a "symbolic gesture", marking the 300th anniversary of the 1654 Treaty of Pereyaslav, called the "Reunification of Ukraine with Russia" in the Soviet Union. It was also attributed to Communist Party first secretary Nikita Khrushchev, although the person who signed the document was Chairman Kliment Voroshilov, the Soviet Union's de jure head of state.

Mark Kramer, professor of Cold War Studies at Harvard University, also claimed that the transfer was partly to help Khruschev's then-precarious political position against the Prime Minister Georgii Malenkov through winning support of the First Secretary of the Ukrainian Communist Party Oleksiy Kyrychenko. Kramer believed that the transfer also aimed to greatly increase the number of ethnic Russians in the Ukrainian SSR which itself was going through problems integrating previous Polish territory due to organized Ukrainian nationalist resistance.

Nina Khrushcheva, a political scientist and the great-granddaughter of Nikita Khrushchev, said of his motivation, "it was somewhat symbolic, somewhat trying to reshuffle the centralized system and also, full disclosure, Nikita Khrushchev was very fond of Ukraine, so I think to some degree it was also a personal gesture toward his favorite republic. He was ethnically Russian, but he really felt great affinity with Ukraine." Sergei Khrushchev, Khrushchev's son, claimed that the decision was due to the building of a hydro-electric dam on the Dnieper River and the consequent desire for all the administration to be under one body. Since Sevastopol in Crimea was the site of the Black Sea Fleet, a quintessential element of Soviet and then of Russian foreign policy, the transfer had the intended effect of binding Ukraine inexorably to Russia, "Eternally Together", as a poster commemorating the event proclaimed. Other reasons given were the integration of the economies of Ukraine and Crimea and the idea that Crimea was a natural extension of the Ukrainian steppes. There was also a desire to repopulate parts of Crimea with Slavic peoples, mainly Russians and Ukrainians, after the peninsula was subject to large-scale criminal deportations of Crimean Tatars to Central Asia by the Soviet regime in 1944.

Aftermath
The transfer increased the ethnic Russian population of Ukraine by almost a million people. Prominent Russian politicians such as Alexander Rutskoy considered the transfer to be controversial. Controversies surrounding the legality of the transfer remained a sore point in relations between Ukraine and Russia for the first few years after the breakup of the Soviet Union, and in particular in the internal politics of Crimea.

In January 1992, the Supreme Soviet of Russia questioned the constitutionality of the transfer, accusing Nikita Khrushchev of treason against the Russian people and said that the transfer was illegitimate. Alexander Rutskoy, the former Vice President of Russia, said that this was a “harebrained scheme”, and that those who signed the document must have been suffering from sunstroke or hangovers.

There was confusion about the status of Sevastopol and whether it was a part of the transfer as it had a degree of independence from the Crimean Oblast and never formally ratified the transfer, although it was later mentioned as Ukrainian territory in the Soviet Constitution and the Belavezha Accords between Ukraine and Russia.

In 1994, a Russian nationalist administration under Yuriy Meshkov took over in Crimea with the promise to return Crimea to Russia, although these plans were later shelved. In a 1997 treaty between the Russian Federation and Ukraine, Russia recognized Ukraine's borders, and accepted Ukraine's sovereignty over Crimea. The treaty expired on 31 March 2019.

Russian annexation of Crimea

After the 2014 Revolution of Dignity, the territories of Sevastopol and Crimea were seized by the Russian Federation; the annexation was formalized following a referendum in which 96% of the Crimean population is reported to have voted "Yes." This move was denounced by the new Ukrainian government and disregarded by most UN states, which continue to recognize Crimea as part of Ukraine. The Venice Commission (an advisory body of the Council of Europe in the field of constitutional law) issued an opinion in 2014, concluding that the referendum was illegal under the Ukrainian constitution and that "circumstances in Crimea did not allow the holding of a referendum in line with European democratic standards."

See also

 North Crimean Canal
 History of Crimea
 Crimea in the Soviet Union

References

External links

1954 in Ukraine
1954 in Russia
1954 in the Soviet Union
Crimea in the Soviet Union
Nikita Khrushchev
Soviet internal politics
Crimea
Territorial evolution of Russia
Ukrainian Soviet Socialist Republic
Russian Soviet Federative Socialist Republic